The code of ethics in media was created by a suggestion from the 1947 Hutchins Commission. They suggested that newspapers, broadcasters and journalists had started to become more responsible for journalism and thought they should be held accountable.

Original guidelines 
The guidelines were set up around two important ideas. The first guideline is that "whoever enjoys a special measure of freedom, like a professional journalist, has an obligation to society to use their freedoms and powers responsibly." This guideline is useful so that people in power are able to be held liable in case their actions are not professional. People that have high media attention should not abuse the power. The second guideline that was established is "society's welfare is paramount, more important than individual careers or even individual rights." Again, may cause a manipulation to the truth of a story holding people responsible for their actions and stating that society is more important due to the vast number of people that could be affected by poor behavior.

The Hutchins Commission added another five guidelines specifically for the press.

  "Present meaningful news, accurate and separated from opinion."
  "Serve as a forum for the exchange of comment and criticism and to expand access to diverse points of view." 
  "Project a representative picture of the constituent groups in society by avoiding stereotypes by including minority groups." 
  "Clarify the goals and values of society; implicit was an appeal to avoid pandering to the lowest common denominator." 
  "Give broad coverage of what was known about society."

All of these guidelines are important because the press is needed to maintain a neutral viewpoint, providing the basic facts and allowing for readers to come up with their own opinions from the news that they report.

These guidelines provide the frame work and inspiration for the Fourth Estate's Journalism Code of Practice and the Society of Professional Journalists Code of Ethics .

Fourth Estate: Journalism Code of Practice 
The Fourth Estate offers a clear and detailed Code of Practice for anyone seeking to create ethical, principled journalism, regardless of their background, employment status, or means of delivery. This code is equally relevant for professional journalists and for those outside the profession who are seeking to report honestly and fairly on the events and issues relevant to their community.

Accuracy 
Accuracy is the overriding value of journalism.

 Ensure that all the facts in your work are accurate.
 Do not omit facts that are material to an understanding of what you are reporting on.
 Context is often critical to accurate reporting. Ensure that adequate context is provided.
 Clearly distinguish between fact and assertion or opinion.

Independence 
Independence from state control, business interests, market forces, or any other vested interest or outside pressure is a hallmark of dispassionate, critical, and reliable journalism. It bolsters legitimacy and credibility in the eyes of the public.

 Make your own editorial judgments based solely on careful consideration of all the facts.
 Do not allow yourself to be influenced by political, sectional, or commercial interests.
 Declare and manage any conflicts of interest, including gifts, funding, advertising relationships, and free or discounted travel or services.

Impartiality 
Impartiality means not being prejudiced towards or against any particular ideology, idea, or preconception. Impartiality requires fairness and balance that follows the weight of evidence: it allows the journalist to make sense of events through dispassionate analysis of all relevant facts and perspectives.

 Treat all facts the same, making editorial judgments and delivering analysis based only on the weight of evidence.
 Do not allow your own views, preferences, biases, or prejudgments to affect your work. Set them aside.
 Do not simply recite lists of facts or engage in false balance: weigh the evidence and reflect that weight of evidence in your work.
 Aim to include an appropriate diversity of views, and accord those views the space warranted by their prominence and significance.

Integrity 
Integrity in journalism ensures that people and organizations uphold the values of journalism, always strive to do the right thing in all situations, even to their personal or organizational detriment, and put their obligations to the public first.

 Treat those you deal with in your work with respect and courtesy.
 Always identify yourself as a journalist, unless withholding disclosure is essential to uncovering the truth in a matter of public importance.
 As far as possible, look for opportunities to “show your workings,” sharing with the public the underlying information you have gathered.
 The use of any form of secret information gathering (hidden cameras, secret recording devices, etc.) may be justifiable if it is essential to uncovering the truth in a matter of public importance.
 Provide anyone accused of misbehavior a reasonable opportunity to respond.
 Attribute information to its source unless that source needs to be protected to ensure the truth can be uncovered in a matter of public importance. Where a source needs anonymity, provide it.
 Do not plagiarize.

Harm minimization 
Journalists must always remember that they are dealing with human lives. The potential for public good must sufficiently outweigh the potential for harm that may come from the activity of journalism.

 Be mindful that your work may contain content that causes harm. Carefully consider how you proceed to ensure that undue harm is not caused.
 Avoid the gratuitous use of offensive, confronting, or harm-inducing sounds, imagery, or words.
 Respect people’s reasonable rights to privacy unless they are outweighed by the need to report on a matter of public importance.
 Show sensitivity when dealing with children, victims of crime, or people who are especially vulnerable due, for example, to trauma, injury, illness, or other factors.

Engagement 
Engagement with the public ensures that journalism remains open, accessible, collaborative, and participatory while keeping the journalist accountable to the highest standards of accuracy, independence, impartiality, and integrity.

 Your decisions on what work to do should be based on what is relevant and newsworthy to the community you serve.
 Establish and maintain open communications with the community.
 Seek input and ideas from the community before, during, and after completing your work.

Accountability 
Accountability is essential to the ethical practice of journalism and the maintenance of the public trust. Being accountable for news-gathering practices and reporting means making firm commitments and taking responsibility for your journalism and the journalism of your peers.

 Seek and carefully consider the feedback you receive from the community about your work.
 Respond constructively to any complaints, particularly those related to matters raised in relation to these standards.
 Where errors or potentially incomplete or misleading information is found, corrections or clarifications should be made promptly, prominently, and transparently.
 Where no errors or incomplete or misleading information is found, your work should not be altered or removed in any material way in response to pressure from outside interests.

Society of Professional Journalists' version 
The Society of Professional Journalists created a code of ethics that are in effect today. The main mantra of the code is "Seek truth and report it."  The code also states that:
"Journalists should be honest, fair, and courageous in gathering, reporting, and interpreting information. Journalists should:
 "Test the accuracy of information from all sources and exercise care to avoid inadvertent error. Deliberate distortion is never permissible." 
 "Diligently seek out subjects of news stories to give them the opportunity to respond to allegations of wrongdoing." 
 "Identify sources whenever feasible. The public is entitled to as much information as possible on sources' reliability." 
 "Always question sources' motives before promising anonymity. Clarify conditions attached to any promise made in exchange for information. Keep promises." 
 "Make certain that headlines, news teases, and promotional material, photos, video, audio, graphics, sound bites, and quotations do not misrepresent. They should not oversimplify or highlight incidents out of context." 
 "Never distort the content of news photos or video. Image enhancement for technical clarity is always permissible. Label montages and photo illustrations." 
 "Avoid misleading reenactments or staged news events. If reenactment is necessary to tell a story, label it." 
 "Avoid undercover or other surreptitious methods of gathering information except when traditional open methods will not yield information vital to the public. Use of such methods should be explained as part of the story." 
 "Never plagiarize." 
 "Tell the story of the diversity and magnitude of the human experience boldly, even, when it is unpopular to do so." 
 "Examine their own cultural values and avoid imposing on those values on others." 
 "Avoid stereotyping by race, gender, age, religion, ethnicity, geography, sexual orientation, disability, physical appearance, or social status." 
 "Support the open exchange of views, even views they find repugnant." 
 "Give voice to the voiceless; official and unofficial sources of information can be equally valid." 
 "Distinguish between advocacy and news reporting. Analysis and commentary should be labeled and not misrepresent fact or content." 
 "Distinguish news from advertising, and shun hybrids that blur the lines between the two." 
 "Recognize and special obligation to ensure that the public's business is conducted in the open and that government records are open to inspection."
 Minimize Harm
"Ethical journalists treat sources, subjects, and colleagues as human beings deserving of respect. Journalists should: " 
 "Show compassion for those who may be affected adversely by news coverage. Use special sensitivity when dealing with children and inexperienced sources or subjects." 
 "Be sensitive when seeking or using interviews or photographs of those affected by tragedy or guilt." 
 "Recognize that gathering and reporting information may cause harm or discomfort. Pursuit of the news is not a license for arrogance." 
 "Recognize that private people have a greater right to control information about themselves that do public officials and others who seek power, influence, or attention. Only an overriding public need can justify intrusion into anyone's privacy." 
 "Show good taste. Avoid pandering to lurid curiosity." 
 "Be cautious of identifying juvenile suspects or victims of sex crimes." 
 "Be judicious about naming criminal suspects before the formal filing of charges." 
 "Balance a criminal suspect's fair trial rights with the public's right to be informed."

Act Independently 
"Journalists should be free of obligation to any interest other than the public's right to know. Journalists should: " 
 "Avoid conflict of interest, real or perceived." 
 "Remain free of associations and activities that may compromise integrity or damage credibility." 
 "Refuse gifts, favors, fees, free travel, and special treatment, and shun secondary employment, political involvement, public office, and service in community organizations if they compromise journalistic integrity."
 "Disclose unavoidable conflicts." (p. 479)
 "Be vigilant and courageous about holding those with power accountable." 
 "Deny favored treatment to advertisers and special interests and resist their pressure to influence news coverage." 
 "Be wary of sources offering information for favors or money; avoid bidding for news."

 Be Accountable 
"Journalists are accountable to their readers, listeners, viewers, and each other. Journalists should: " 
 "Clarify and explain news coverage and invite dialogue with the public over journalistic conduct." 
 "Encourage the public to voice grievances against the news media." 
 "Admit mistakes and correct them promptly." 
 "Expose unethical practices of journalists and the news media." 
 "Abide by the same high standards to which they hold others."

All of these guidelines are for the betterment of society and regulation of media.

See also 
 Journalism ethics and standards
 Journalism ethics and standards#Codes of practice
 International Council for Press and Broadcasting
 International Council for Press and Broadcasting#Media Ethics Code

References 
Sources
Straubhaar, Joseph D., Robert LaRose, and Lucinda Davenport. Media Now: Understanding Media, Culture, and Technology. Boston, MA: Wadsworth Cengage Learning, 2010. Print.

Citations

External links 
 http://www.spj.org/ethicscode.asp
 https://www.fourthestate.org/journalism-code-of-practice

Journalism ethics